Maslovka is a rural locality (a selo) in Prokhorovsky District, Belgorod Oblast, Russia. The population was 371 as of 2010. There are 5 streets.

Geography 
Maslovka is located 30 km east of Prokhorovka (the district's administrative centre) by road. Raisovka is the nearest rural locality.

References 

Rural localities in Prokhorovsky District